Poienari may refer to several places in Romania:

Poienari, a commune in Neamţ County
 Poienari, a village in Hălmagiu Commune, Arad County
 Poienari, a village in Corbeni Commune, Argeș County
 Poienari, a village in Poienarii de Argeș Commune, Argeș County
 Poienari, a village in Poienarii de Muscel Commune, Argeș County
 Poienari, a village in Bumbești-Pițic Commune, Gorj County
 Poienari, a village in Dolhasca town, Suceava County
 Poienari, a village in Ghioroiu Commune, Vâlcea County
 Poienarii Burchii, a commune in Prahova County, and its villages of Poienarii-Rali and Poienarii Vechi
 Poienarii de Argeș, a commune in Argeș County
 Poienarii de Muscel, a commune in Argeș County
 Poienarii Apostoli, a village in Gorgota Commune, Prahova County
 Poienari (Prahova), a tributary of the Prahova in Prahova County
 Poienari, a tributary of the Râul Târgului in Argeș County

See also

Poenari (disambiguation)